Pachyammos is a village in the Nicosia District of Cyprus, located in Tillyria area just west of the Kokkina exclave.

References

Communities in Nicosia District